Pajala Municipality is a municipality in Norrbotten County in northern Sweden, bordering Finland. Its seat is located in the locality of Pajala.

In 1884 Tärendö was detached from Pajala Municipality, forming a municipality of its own. In 1914 Pajala Municipality was once again split when Junosuando broke away. They were reunited in 1971, when Korpilombolo was added as well.

Finnish and Meänkieli have the official status of being minority languages in the municipality.

History

Its geographical location means that Pajala Municipality has always been a natural trading place, where people from Sweden, Finland and the native Sami people gathered. The annual Pajala market traces its history from the 18th century.

The home of Lars Levi Læstadius, famed botanist and Christian revivalist movement founder is located in Pajala. It is the red house to the right; it is now a museum. The yellow house in the middle was used as the local Lutheran vicar's mansion from 1850 up to recent times.

Geography
The municipality is one of Sweden's largest, geographically, at around 8,000 km², or roughly the size of the historical province of Södermanland, which - compared to Pajala Municipality's population of approximately 6,500 - has more than one million inhabitants.

In Pajala is also Jupukkamasten, a 335 metre tall guyed mast for FM- and TV-transmission, which together with three other guyed masts of the same height is the tallest structure in Sweden.

Localities
There are four localities (or urban areas) in Pajala Municipality:

The municipal seat in bold

Government and politics

Riksdag
These are the results since the 1972 municipal reform. Norrbotten Party participated in 1994 but the results were not published by SCB due to the party's small size at the time.

Blocs

This lists the relative strength of the socialist and centre-right blocs since 1973, but parties not elected to the Riksdag are inserted as "other", including the Sweden Democrats results from 1988 to 2006, but also the Christian Democrats pre-1991 and the Greens in 1982, 1985 and 1991. The sources are identical to the table above. The coalition or government mandate marked in bold formed the government after the election. New Democracy got elected in 1991 but are still listed as "other" due to the short lifespan of the party. "Elected" is the total number of percentage points from the municipality that went to parties who were elected to the Riksdag.

Distribution of the 33 seats in the municipal council after the 2010 election:

Social Democratic Party   18
Left Party   7
Christian Democrats   3
Moderate Party   2
Norrbottens Sjukvårdsparti   2
Centre Party   1

Results of the 2010 Swedish general election in Pajala:

Social Democratic Party   51.3%
Left Party   18.8%
Moderate Party   12.6%
Christian Democrats   5.5%
Sweden Democrats   3.9%
Centre Party   3.2%
Liberal People's Party   2.1%
Green Party   2.1%

Sister cities
Pajala Municipality has three sister cities:
 Målselv, Norway
 Kolari, Finland
 Olenegorsk, Russia

See also
Keräntöjärvi

References

External links

Pajala Municipality - Official site
World's largest sundial in Pajala

Municipalities of Norrbotten County
Meänkieli language municipalities